The 2014 European Track Championships (under-23 & junior) were the 14th continental championships for European under-23 and junior track cyclists, and the 5th since the event was renamed following the reorganisation of European track cycling in 2010. The event took place at the Velódromo Nacional de Sangalhos in Anadia, Portugal from 22 to 27 July 2014. This was the fourth year in succession the championships were held at this venue.



Medal summary

Under 23

Junior

Medal table

References

External links
UEC Event page
AllSportDB.com Event page

European Track Championships, 2014
under-23